This is a list of law enforcement agencies in the U.S. state of Nevada.

According to the US Bureau of Justice Statistics' 2008 Census of State and Local Law Enforcement Agencies, the state had 76 law enforcement agencies employing 6,643 sworn police officers, about 254 for each 100,000 residents.

Law enforcement in Nevada 
The State of Nevada Peace Officers' Standards and Training Commission is responsible to:
provide for and encourage the training and education of persons whose primary duty is law enforcement to ensure the safety of the residents of and visitors to this state.
Shall adopt regulations establishing minimum standards for the certification and decertification, recruitment, selection and training of peace officers.

Within Nevada, Peace Officers are grouped into one of three classes, Category I, Category II, or Category III:
 Category I peace officers include traditional law enforcement officers such as Police Officers, Deputy Sheriffs, Deputy Marshals, Parole & Probation Officers, and State Troopers of the Nevada Highway Patrol. The Category I peace officer training is a minimum of 480 hours.
 Category II peace officers are specialists and include officers such as Taxicab Authority Officers, Gaming Control Agents, and Constables. The Category II training is a minimum of 330 hours.
 Category III peace officers are those officers assigned solely to State Corrections & City/County Detention. The Category III training is a minimum of 6 weeks.

State agencies
 Nevada Department of Agricultural
 Agriculture Enforcement Division
 Nevada Department of Conservation and Natural Resources
 State Parks Division
 Nevada Department of Corrections
 Nevada Department of Public Safety
 Capitol Police
 Nevada Highway Patrol
 Investigation Division
 Legislative Police
 Parole and Probation
 State Fire Marshal
 Nevada Department of Wildlife
Law Enforcement Division
 Nevada Gaming Control Board
 Nevada Taxicab Authority

County agencies

 Churchill County Sheriff's Office
 Clark County Park Police
 Clark County Marshal's Office (Nevada)
 Douglas County Sheriff's Department
 Elko County Sheriff's Office
 Esmeralda County Sheriff's Office
 Eureka County Sheriff's Office
 Humboldt County Sheriff's Office
 Mineral County Sheriff's Office
 Lander County Sheriff's Office
 Lincoln County Sheriff's Office
 Lyon County Sheriff's Office
 Nye County Sheriff's Office
 Pershing County Sheriff's Office
 Storey County Sheriff's Office
 White Pine county Sheriff's Office
 Washoe county sheriff's office

Joint jurisdiction/city-county agencies
 Carson City Sheriff’s Office
 Las Vegas Metropolitan Police Department

City agencies

 Boulder City Police Department
 Carlin Police Department
 Elko Police Department
 Ely Police Department
 Fallon Police Department
 Henderson Police Department
 City of Las Vegas Municipal Court Marshals
 City of Las Vegas Department of Public Safety
 Las Vegas City Marshals
 Lovelock Police Department
 Mesquite Constable
 Mesquite Police Department
 North Las Vegas Constable
 North Las Vegas Police Department
 Reno Police Department
 Sparks Police Department
 West Wendover Police Department
 Winnemucca Police Department
 Yerington Police Department

Tribal agencies
 Wells Tribal Law Enforcement
 Pyramid Lake Tribal Police
 Reno Sparks Indian Colony Tribal Police

Railroad police
 Union Pacific Police Department

Defunct Agencies 
 Clark County Sheriff's Department
 Las Vegas Police Department
 Las Vegas Department of Detention & Enforcement

References 

Nevada

Law enforcement agencies